Richard Godfrey Seal (4 December 1935 – 19 July 2022) was an English organist and conductor. From 1968 to 1997 he served as organist and master of the choristers at Salisbury Cathedral, which in 1991 began recruiting girls to the cathedral choir, the first cathedral to do so.

Family and education
Seal was born Banstead, Surrey, and was a boy chorister at New College, Oxford, under Herbert Kennedy Andrews. He continued his education at Cranleigh School in Surrey and was an organ scholar at Christ's College, Cambridge. This was followed by a year's study at the Royal College of Music in London, while also serving as assistant organist at Kingsway Hall.

In 1975 he married Dr. Sarah Hamilton, with whom he had two sons.

Career
After completing National Service in Malaya, Seal was briefly assistant organist at St Bartholomew-the-Great in Smithfield, London (1960–1961), before serving as assistant organist to John Birch at Chichester Cathedral (1961–1968).

In 1968 he took up the post of organist and master of the choristers at Salisbury Cathedral, a position which he held until 1997. In 1991 he began recruiting girls to the cathedral choir, the first English cathedral to do so. A controversial move at the time, it led to a transformation in Anglican choral singing. The girl and boy choristers usually sing separately.

While at Salisbury, Seal made many recordings and broadcasts with the cathedral choir.

He was also conductor and president of the Salisbury Orchestral Society from 1969 to 1994.

Awards and later life
In recognition of his distinguished service to English cathedral music Seal was awarded the Lambeth degree of Doctor of Music in 1992.

Seal retired to Bishopstone, near Salisbury, and continued to play the organ at services in local churches. He died on 19 July 2022 at the age of 86.

References

External links 
 

1935 births
2022 deaths
English organists
British male organists
People educated at Cranleigh School
English conductors (music)
British male conductors (music)
Assistant Organists of Chichester Cathedral
20th-century British conductors (music)
20th-century English musicians
21st-century British conductors (music)
21st-century organists
20th-century British male musicians
21st-century British male musicians
People from Banstead
Male classical organists